Buletin Siang (lit. Daytime Bulletin) was the first daytime newscast ever produced by an Indonesian private television network. It was launched on 25 August 1993 on the privately owned RCTI television network in Indonesia. The program was also carried by RCTI's then sister network, SCTV.

On 9 February 2009, all news programs on RCTI were renamed under the revamped Seputar Indonesia brand, now called Satu Seputar Indonesia (One Around Indonesia), at which point Buletin Siang was renamed Seputar Indonesia Siang.

Logos
The Buletin Siang logo was originally a purple square containing the words BULETIN SIANG and an orange circle with a narrow triangle. This logo was used from 24 August 1993 until 23 August 1999.

From 24 August 1999 until 31 July 2003 the Buletin Siang logo was a blue and white circle surrounding a narrow blue triangle.

From 1 August 2003 until 23 August 2006 the Buletin Siang logo used 3D graphics.

On 24 August 2006, the logo was changed to that of Seputar Indonesia, which was used until 9 February 2009.

Segments

Buletin Wanita (1993–2006)
Wajah (1993–2006)

Anchors

 Gustav Aulia
 Dentamira Kusuma
 Chrysanti Suwarso
 Fauziah Dasuki
 Ratna Komala
 Atika Suri
 Desi Anwar
 Dana Iswara
 Zsa Zsa Yusharyahya
 Aiman Witjaksono
 Putra Nababan
 Isyana Bagoes Oka

See also
Nuansa Pagi
Buletin Malam

Indonesian television news shows
1993 Indonesian television series debuts
1990s Indonesian television series
2000s Indonesian television series
2009 Indonesian television series endings
RCTI original programming
SCTV (TV network) original programming